Barsel is a surname. Notable people with the surname include:

Esther Barsel (1925–2008), South African political activist
Hymie Barsel (1920–1987), South African activist 
Kiprop Barsel (2001-present), Systems and IT Analyst ABSA, Kenya